Antisec may refer to:

Antisec Movement, a group opposed to computer security.
Operation AntiSec, an ongoing hacking operation involving hacking groups LulzSec and Anonymous.